The steam motorised locomotive no. 19 1001 was a German, express train steam locomotive with the Deutsche Reichsbahn.

In 1941 Henschel delivered this fully streamlined trials locomotive with factory number 25000. The proven method of a single-axle drive to each axle used on electric locomotives was adopted for this locomotive. The four driving axles were therefore each driven by a separate steam-driven motor.

References

External links 
Description and many photos by André Schneider

19.10
2-8-2 locomotives
19.10
Henschel locomotives
Railway locomotives introduced in 1941
Individual locomotives of Germany
Standard gauge locomotives of Germany
Streamlined steam locomotives

Passenger locomotives